Luigi Sorrentino (born 17 April 1977) is an Italian rower. He competed in the men's coxless pair event at the 2000 Summer Olympics.

References

1977 births
Living people
Italian male rowers
Olympic rowers of Italy
Rowers at the 2000 Summer Olympics
Rowers from Naples